In topology, the Bing metrization theorem, named after R. H. Bing, characterizes when a topological space is metrizable.

Formal statement 

The theorem states that a topological space  is metrizable if and only if it is regular and T0 and has a σ-discrete basis. A family of sets is called σ-discrete when it is a union of countably many discrete collections, where a family  of subsets of a space  is called discrete, when every point of  has a neighborhood that intersects at most one member of

History 

The theorem was proven by Bing in 1951 and was an independent discovery with the Nagata–Smirnov metrization theorem that was proved independently by both Nagata (1950) and Smirnov (1951). Both theorems are often merged in the Bing-Nagata-Smirnov metrization theorem. It is a common tool to prove other metrization theorems, e.g. the Moore metrization theorem – a collectionwise normal, Moore space is metrizable – is a direct consequence.

Comparison with other metrization theorems 

Unlike the Urysohn's metrization theorem which provides a sufficient condition for metrization, this theorem provides both a necessary and sufficient condition for a topological space to be metrizable.

See also

References 

 "General Topology", Ryszard Engelking, Heldermann Verlag Berlin, 1989. 

Theorems in topology

de:Satz von Bing-Nagata-Smirnow